Eduniversal is a university ranking business by the French consulting company and rating agency SMBG specialized in Higher Education. Founded in 1994, one of the main goals of Eduniversal is to provide a tool, for students all around the world, which provides information on the Best Business Schools, located in Eduniversal's 9 geographical regions (the 5 continents).

The Eduniversal ranking agency establishes an official selection of the Best 1000 Business Schools in more than 150 countries in the world. The purpose of this  selection is to offer students a serious referent that reflects the international dimension of each School, and therefore enables them to make the right decision regarding the choice of their future School.

The International Scientific Committee at the initiative of the Eduniversal Company is composed of 12 members; 9 members coming from nine different geographic zones (Africa, Central Asia, Eastern Europe, Eurasia and Middle East, Far East Asia, Latin America, North America, Oceania and Western Europe), and 2 members from the Eduniversal Company (The CEO and the International Coordinator).

Methodology
The official selection as it is defined by the Eduniversal Company is the classification of the 1000 best Business Schools in 153 countries in the World. The selection is classified in terms of Palms and Ratings, issued from the Deans' votes.
The aim of this official selection is to provide sufficient information for students about a range of academic institutions, sorted by their reputations and international ambitions and located in 9 different zones.

References

Business schools
University and college rankings